Coromines is a Spanish surname that may refer to

Joan Coromines (1905–1997), Spanish linguist
Jordi Guixé i Coromines (born 1970), Spanish historian
Pere Coromines i Montanya (1870–1939), Spanish writer, politician, and economist

See also
Corominas

Spanish-language surnames
Catalan-language surnames